Jeavestone is a Finnish progressive rock band founded in 1999. The members of the band use stage names and are: Tommy Glorioso (bass), Jim Goldworth (lead vocals, electric and acoustic guitars), Kingo (drums and percussion), and Mickey Maniac (backing vocals, guitar, melodica). They write their music themselves. The band’s first album was released only in Finland, but following some successful concerts in Germany in 2006, their second was also released in Germany, Austria, and Switzerland. In 2009 Jeavestone played its debut performances in the United Kingdom, Denmark, and Sweden.

Jeavestone’s style is so called 'eclectic prog'. They amalgamate the influence of 1970s classic prog acts like Gentle Giant or King Crimson with modern sounding rock, without trying to eschew even humorous aspects. Their instrumentation spans from traditional rock combo on the first album to the extensive use of woodwind and string instruments on the second.

Discography

EPs and singles 
 Jeavestone (2001, EP, self-published)
 Crazy Madness / Beauty Contest (2005, Wolfgang Records)
 Plastic Landscaper (2007)
 Hot Summer Fun / Mirror Monologue (2009, Presence Records)
 Repiphany (2013, Grass Bay Records)

Albums 
 Mind the Soup (2005, Wolfgang Records)
 Spices, Species and Poetry Petrol (2008, Presence Records)
 1+1=OK (2010, Presence Records)
 Human Games (2016, Presence Records)

Compilations 
 Kaamos's "Delightful" on Tuonen Tytär 2 (2009) (a compilation of Finnish progressive rock of the 1970s)

External links 
 Homepage
 Jeavestone at MySpace

Finnish progressive rock groups